In the military, vehicles such as trucks or tractor units can be used to transport or launch missiles (rockets with warheads), essentially a form of rocket artillery.

History
The missile vehicle may be a self-propelled unit or the missile holder/launcher may be on a trailer towed by a prime mover.  They are used in the military forces of a number of countries in the world.  Long missiles are commonly transported parallel to the ground on these vehicles, but elevated into an inclined or vertical position for launching.  Missile vehicles include transporter erector launchers (TEL) and multiple rocket launchers (MRL) such as the Patriot missile system.  Single or dual missile vehicles often transport their missiles uncovered.  The missile batteries of multiple rocket launchers often hold their missiles inside tubular or rectangular canisters for each missile, from which the missiles or rockets can be launched (or fired, in other words).  Many missile trucks use pneumatic (air-filled) tires, although they may be large and specialized for offroad travel.  However, some missile vehicles use tractor crawler drive similar to that of a tank.

The Katyusha rocket launcher was an early launcher mostly mounted on missile trucks used by the Soviet Union during World War II.   In turn, the US produced in World War II the T34 Calliope missile-launching vehicle in limited quantities by attaching a multiple-missile battery atop an M4 Sherman tank.

Among the largest missile vehicles are the multi-wheeled (tires) 8-axle MZKT-79221 carrying vehicles for Topol-M ICBMs as the Russian army's longest trucks.  As of December 2008, there are six such road-mobile missile systems.
Another Russian example is the truck for the Pechora-2M Surface-to-Air Anti-aircraft missile system, which can transport and launch two missiles,
and also used by some other countries.  

American examples of single-missile launcher trucks include M39 Series Trucks, M289 and M896 Honest John Missile Launcher Trucks.

In these trucks after transporting the missile, the missile-launching mechanism with the missile on it is pivoted upwards to put it into position for launching.

Some trucks carry a battery containing four US Harpoon or Patriot missiles for launching.

These multiple missile batteries are also pivoted upwards for launching and the launcher in some cases can be rotated around on the chassis (or platform) of the truck.  To prepare for launching operations, outriggers are extended from the truck and placed on the ground to stabilize the truck from a recoil reaction during a missile launch.

The M270 Multiple Launch Rocket System, used in the USA and several other countries, uses a tractor crawler drive instead of conventional pneumatic tires.  An example of a single-missile vehicle with a tractor crawler drive is the French Pluton missile launcher, based on the AMX-30 tank.  The 2K11 Krug is a Soviet/Russian two-missile transporter erector launcher with a tractor crawler drive.  The Russians also have rather extensive S-300 missile systems on various vehicles.  Other examples of Soviet MRLs include the BM-21 Grad, BM-27 Uragan, and BM-30 Smerch, which use pneumatic tires and tubular missile canisters and are also used by various other countries. A Soviet-produced 9K52 Luna-M missile system uses a 9P113 single-missile TEL with pneumatic tires to transport an uncovered Soviet 9M21 missile.  

American missile vehicles include the M1134 Anti-Tank Guided Missile Vehicle from the Stryker family of military vehicles (with pneumatic tires and smaller BGM-71 TOW missiles), MIM-72 Chaparral (with tractor crawler drive and four exposed missiles), and AN/TWQ-1 Avenger (with pneumatic tires and anti-aircraft missile canisters) systems.  The Long Range Surveillance and Attack Vehicle produced by Lockheed Martin for the USA is an armored vehicle with four large pneumatic tires on each side (left and right) and is able to fire missiles from its rotatable turret on top of the vehicle.  

The initially Soviet then Russian family of S-300 missile systems has been upgraded by the Russian military to the current S-400 Triumf missiles and their carrier vehicles and put into service starting in 2007.  The launch tubes with their S-400 missiles inside are transported horizontally (see photo in gallery below), and the battery of launch tubes with missiles are moved into a vertical position for launching with the launch tube bottoms on the ground (see photo of S-400 battery in vertical launch position in gallery below).

In the former Soviet Union and now in Russia, missile trucks with their missiles on display drove through in Victory Day Parades in Red Square, Moscow each May.

Gallery of missile vehicle photos

References 

Rockets and missiles
Rocket artillery
Self-propelled rocket launchers